Waun Rydd is a mountain in the Brecon Beacons National Park, in southern Powys, Wales. Its height is 769 m (2,523 ft) and it tops a large boggy plateau rising to the east of Pen y Fan.

The hill takes the form of a plateau with sharp rims on several sides.  To the northeast is Craig Pwllfa overlooking Cwm Banw whilst Craig y Fan looks east over Cwm Tarthwynni. To the south is the edge known as Cwar y Gigfran which translates into English as 'quarry of the crow'.  It marks the top of a large landslipped area extending to the stream of Blaen y Glyn below.

Several ridges extend north and east from the plateau. That known as Gist Wen runs north-northeast to the subsidiary top of Bryn (561m above sea level). The short ridges of Cefn Bach and Cefn Edmwnt run northeast whilst that of Twyn Du extends eastwards towards Talybont Reservoir. A further ridge runs southeast to the subsidiary top of Allt Lwyd (654m). To the south a broad ridge runs to a col beyond which is the top of Allt Forgan (513m).

References

External links
 Waun Rydd at hill-bagging.co.uk
 www.geograph.co.uk : photos of Waun Rydd and surrounding area

Brecon Beacons
Mountains and hills of Powys
Marilyns of Wales
Hewitts of Wales
Nuttalls